The Telephone Co. Building in Grand Forks, North Dakota, United States, was built in 1904.  It was listed on the National Register of Historic Places in 1982.

It includes Early Commercial, "Vernacular-Classical Detail", and other architecture.

The listing is described in its North Dakota Cultural Resources Survey document.

Along with Wright Block, the Clifford Annex, the Dinnie Block, and Golden Square, the Telephone Co. Building was one of many "commercial vernacular brick buildings with classical revival details" that were built during a major building boom, with high quality brickwork.  It was built in 1904 by the Northwestern Telephone Exchange Company, which later became Northwestern Bell.  This replaced a previous exchange that was located on the fourth floor of an office building, which had some accessibility problems.  A 1901 author pointed out that the cable ran into the office from a nearby pole and was unsightly, and that the wiring inside the building was not very orderly either.  The building was rather crowded.  The company was in the process of buying a lot for the new exchange building.

References

Commercial buildings on the National Register of Historic Places in North Dakota
Vernacular architecture in North Dakota
Buildings designated early commercial in the National Register of Historic Places
Infrastructure completed in 1904
Telephone exchange buildings
Telecommunications buildings on the National Register of Historic Places
National Register of Historic Places in Grand Forks, North Dakota
Lumen Technologies
1904 establishments in North Dakota